UFC Fight Night: Lemos vs. Andrade (also known as UFC Fight Night 205 and UFC on ESPN+ 63 or UFC Vegas 52)  was a mixed martial arts event produced by the Ultimate Fighting Championship that took place on April 23, 2022, at the UFC Apex facility in Enterprise, Nevada, part of the Las Vegas Metropolitan Area, United States.

Background
A women's strawweight bout between former UFC Women's Strawweight Champion Jéssica Andrade and Amanda Lemos headlined the event.

A women's flyweight bout between Montana De La Rosa and Maycee Barber was expected to take place at UFC 269, but it was postponed due to De La Rosa getting injured. They met at this event instead.

A heavyweight bout between Tanner Boser and Rodrigo Nascimento was scheduled for the event. However, Nascimento withdrew from the event for unknown reasons and was replaced by Alexander Romanov. In turn, Boser tweeted on April 18 that he was out of the fight due to an injury. He was replaced by Chase Sherman. Subsequently, Sherman was deemed unable to compete due to a minor health issue on the day of the event and the fight was pushed back a week.

A middleweight bout between Jordan Wright and Roman Kopylov was expected for the event. However, Kopylov withdrew due to medical reasons and was replaced by Marc-André Barriault in a catchweight of 190 pounds.

Damir Hadžović was expected to meet Steve Garcia in a lightweight bout at the event. However, Hadžović pulled out due to alleged visa issues which restricted his travel.

Louis Cosce and Preston Parsons were expected to meet in a welterweight bout at the event. However, Cosce announced his withdrawal from the event on April 16 after testing positive for COVID-19. He was replaced by Evan Elder.

A flyweight bout between former Rizin Bantamweight Champion Manel Kape and Su Mudaerji was expected to take place at the event. However, just two days before the event, Kape withdrew due to personal reasons and the bout was scrapped.

Results

Bonus awards 
The following fighters received $50,000 bonuses.
 Fight of the Night: Sergey Khandozhko vs. Dwight Grant
 Performance of the Night: Jéssica Andrade and Claudio Puelles

See also 

 List of UFC events
 List of current UFC fighters
 2022 in UFC

References 

UFC Fight Night
2022 in mixed martial arts
April 2022 sports events in the United States
2022 in sports in Nevada
Mixed martial arts in Las Vegas
Sports competitions in Las Vegas